Lampropholis caligula, also known commonly as the montane sunskink or the montane sun skink, is a species of lizard in the family Scincidae. The species is endemic to New South Wales in Australia.

Etymology
The specific name, caligula, refers to the Roman emperor, Caligula.

Habitat
The preferred natural habitats of L. caligula are forest, shrubland, and freshwater wetlands.

Reproduction
L. caligula is oviparous.

References

Further reading
Cogger HG (2014). Reptiles and Amphibians of Australia, Seventh Edition. Clayton, Victoria, Australia: CSIRO Publishing. xxx + 1,033 pp. . 
Ingram GJ, Rawlinson PA (1981). "Five new species of skinks (genus Lampropholis) from Queensland and New South Wales". Memoirs of the Queensland Museum 20 (2): 311–317. (Lampropholis caligula, new species).
Wilson S, Swan G (2013). A Complete Guide to Reptiles of Australia, Fourth Edition. Sydney: New Holland Publishers. 522 pp. .

Skinks of Australia
Endemic fauna of Australia
Reptiles described in 1981
Lampropholis
Taxa named by Glen Joseph Ingram
Taxa named by Peter Alan Rawlinson